Crestwood is a historic home in Valdosta, Georgia. It was added to the National Register of Historic Places on January 12, 1984. It is located at 502 Eager Road. The home was designed by William G. Eager and built in 1915. The home includes five bedrooms and four bathrooms on 2.51 acres. It was for sale in 2013. The columns and some other materials were salvaged from partially burned home at 701 North Patterson Street. Crestwood's west wing was added in 1928. It includes a library, two bedrooms upstairs, a bathroom, and closets. The home was renovated and the kitchen updated in 1982 according to designs by Richard Hill of Valdosta. The home was part of a pecan plantation. It includes a two-story columned portico and a porte-cochere on the east side. The library has a large limestone fireplace.

William Eager designed a sawed-off shotgun used in trench warfare during World War I.

Its front yard remained a pecan grove in 1983.

See also

 National Register of Historic Places listings in Lowndes County, Georgia

References

Houses on the National Register of Historic Places in Georgia (U.S. state)
Houses in Lowndes County, Georgia
National Register of Historic Places in Lowndes County, Georgia
Neoclassical architecture in Georgia (U.S. state)